David George Hahn (15 May 1925 – 8 December 2012) was a Liberal party member of the House of Commons of Canada. He was a businessman by career.

He was first elected at the Broadview riding in the 1963 general election, after an unsuccessful attempt in 1962. After one term in the 26th Canadian Parliament, he was defeated in the 1965 election by John Gilbert of the New Democratic Party.

Hahn served as Parliamentary Secretary to the Minister of Industry from July to September, 1965. He died in Collingwood in 2012.

References

 

1925 births
2012 deaths
Members of the House of Commons of Canada from Ontario
Liberal Party of Canada MPs
Politicians from Toronto